Vester Hassing is a Danish town in North Jutland, Denmark immediately north of the Limfjord, and a part of Aalborg Municipality and Region Nordjylland. The town is situated 17 km to the east from Aalborg, where the majority of the citizens are working.

Vester Hassing lies in a hilly moraine landscape between the villages, Stae and Gandrup. The church dates from c. 1200 AD.

Vester Hassing had a strong growth in the 1970s, where among others a great part the towns residential areas were built. After some years with stagnation in population, the town experienced growth after year 2004, when new homes were built.
Since then commerce has grown and new residential areas have been developed.

Since 2001 there has been a music festival held each year called Limfjordsfest, where both local and foreign artists appear.

At Vester Hassing there is a Danish static inverter station of the HVDC Konti–Skan with the static inverters of Konti-Skan 1 and Konti-Skan 2.

Vester Hassing has a population of 2,589 (1 January 2022)

Famous people from Vester Hassing

 Erik Barslev, (Danish Wiki) (born 1955) former successful national athletics coach
 Niels Skovmand, a well-known radio host from a radio station called HIT FM Denmark

External links
 Satellite image from Google Maps

References

Cities and towns in the North Jutland Region
Towns and settlements in Aalborg Municipality